Pieter Hintjens (3 December 1962 – 4 October 2016) was a Belgian software developer, author, and past president of the Foundation for a Free Information Infrastructure (FFII), an association that fights against software patents. In 2007, he was nominated one of the "50 most influential people in IP" by Managing Intellectual Property magazine.

Biography
Hintjens was born in Congo in 1962 and grew up in East Africa.

Hintjens served as CEO and chief software designer for iMatix, a firm that produced free software applications, such as the ZeroMQ high performance message library, the OpenAMQ AMQP messaging service, Libero, the GSL code generator, and the Xitami web server.

He was active in open standards development, being the author of the original Advanced Message Queuing Protocol (AMQP), a founder of the Digital Standards Organization, and the editor of the RestMS web messaging protocol. RestMS is developed using a peer-to-peer, share-alike, branch and merge model (COSS) developed by Hintjens and others for the Digital Standards Organization in 2008.

He was CEO of Wikidot Inc., one of the fastest growing wikifarms, until February 2010.

In 2010, Hintjens was diagnosed with bile duct cancer, which was successfully surgically removed. However, in April 2016, it returned and he was diagnosed with terminal cholangiocarcinoma. Hintjens underwent voluntary euthanasia on 4 October 2016.

ZeroMQ 
While in his position as iMatix CEO, Hintjens founded the ZeroMQ software project together with Martin Sustrik. ZeroMQ is a high-performance asynchronous messaging library aimed at use in scalable distributed or concurrent applications.

In November 2013, Hintjens announced EdgeNet, a project building upon ZeroMQ for mesh networks. EdgeNet aims to build a secure, anonymous peer-to-peer alternative to the internet. Hintjens also authored several ZeroMQ projects, such as CZMQ, zproto, and Malamute.

Views
In October 2007, Hintjens warned that after mortgages and consumer debt, patents were a third economic bubble waiting to damage the global economy, writing: "House prices fall and bad debt shakes the financial markets across the US and Europe. Bankers look nervously at their portfolios of consumer debt and mortgages. But some analysts say that it's patents, not houses or loans, that will tip the global financial market into crisis".<ref name="crisis">Digital Majority, [http://www.digitalmajority.org/forum/t-21772/will-the-patent-system-trigger-financial-collapse-in-2008 "Will the patent system trigger financial collapse in 2008?]</ref>

Hintjens was also owner and principal author of The Devil's Wiki, which defines a patent as "A medieval economic tool by which politicians attempt to stimulate trade and wealth by banning innovation and competition in crucial areas of technology".

Bibliography
 "Confessions of a Necromancer", 2016
 "Social Architecture", 2016
 "The Psychopath Code", 2015
 "ZeroMQ: Messaging for Many Applications", O'Reilly Media'', 2013
 "Culture and Empire: Digital Revolution", 2013
 "Code Connected Volume 1", 2013
 "Scalable C", unfinished
 "A protocol for dying", 2016

References

External links
 Hintjens.com official website
 Devil's Wiki
 gca.org
 heironymouscoward.blogspot.com
 Free Software magazine Issue 12
 CapsOff Website
 OpenAMQ AMQP messaging system
 Confessions of a Necromancer - Hintjens.com
 "A Protocol for Dying" - Hintjens.com
 "ZeroMQ founder Pieter Hintjens dies" - SD Times blog

1962 births
2016 deaths
Belgian activists
Belgian computer programmers
Belgian computer scientists
Deaths by euthanasia
Democratic Republic of the Congo emigrants to Belgium
Free software people
Patent law